The 2005 Eastern Illinois Panthers football team represented Eastern Illinois University as a member of the Ohio Valley Conference (OVC) during the 2005 NCAA Division I-AA football season. Led by 19th-year head coach Bob Spoo, the Panthers compiled an overall record of 9–3 with a mark of 8–0 in conference play, winning the OVC title. Eastern Illinois was invited to the NCAA Division I-AA Football Championship playoffs, where they lost Southern Illinois in the first round.

Schedule

Roster

References

Eastern Illinois
Eastern Illinois Panthers football seasons
Ohio Valley Conference football champion seasons
Eastern Illinois Panthers football